Firestone Fieldhouse is a multipurpose arena located near Malibu, California, on the campus of Pepperdine University. It was built in 1973 as the home of the Pepperdine Waves basketball and volleyball teams, who still play at the Fieldhouse today. It seats 3,104 for sporting events and up to 5,000 for concerts, graduation ceremonies, and lectures.

The Fieldhouse was officially dedicated on September 20, 1975, by President Gerald R. Ford. A year later, 4,500 fans crowded the Fieldhouse to see Pepperdine defeat the UNLV Runnin' Rebels basketball team by a score of 93–91. At over forty years old, the Fieldhouse is the smallest and second-oldest basketball arena in the West Coast Conference. 

The floor at Firestone Fieldhouse, which measures  by 110 feet (12,100 square feet) has been replaced twice. The current floor at the arena is a wooden floor.

See also
 List of NCAA Division I basketball arenas

References

External links
 Pepperdine Waves profile

Basketball venues in California
College basketball venues in the United States
College volleyball venues in the United States
Indoor arenas in California
Pepperdine Waves basketball
Pepperdine Waves volleyball
Sports venues in Greater Los Angeles
Volleyball venues in California
Sports venues completed in 1973